Capacsaya, Ccapacsaya (possibly from Quechua qhapaq mighty, saya slope, "mighty slope"), Media Luna or Huayurioc is a mountain in the Urubamba mountain range in the Andes of Peru, about  high. It is located in the Cusco Region, Calca Province, Lares District, and in the Urubamba Province, Urubamba District. Capacsaya lies northwest of Chicón and east of Pumahuanca, near Pumahuancajasa pass.

References

Mountains of Peru
Mountains of Cusco Region